Eminella is a monotypic genus of Argentinian running crab spiders containing the single species, Eminella ctenops. It was first described by H. Özdikmen in 2007, and is only found in Argentina.

See also
 List of Philodromidae species

References

Monotypic Araneomorphae genera
Philodromidae
Spiders of Argentina